ISIRTA plays, J-Q

Plays, with titles beginning with 'J', 'K', 'L', 'M', 'N', 'O', 'P' and 'Q' on the radio comedy programme "I'm Sorry, I'll Read That Again"

J plays

Jack and the Beanstalk

Cast

Structure of the episode

Jack the Ripper

Cast

Structure of the episode

Jorrocks Memoirs of a Fox Hunting Man

Cast
 Narrators ― David Hatch and Tim Brooke-Taylor
 Jorrocks ― Graeme Garden
 Grimbling ― Bill Oddie
 Lady Constance de Coverlet ― Tim Brooke-Taylor
 Hunting Party Members ― John Cleese, Graeme Garden, and Jo Kendall
 Butler ― John Cleese
 Jorrocks's Wife ― Graeme Garden
 Jorrocks's Daughter ― Tim Brooke-Taylor
 Jorrocks's Horse ― John Cleese
 Antonio Goldstein ― John Cleese
 Company ― Tim Brooke-Taylor
 Crying Hounds ― John Cleese and Bill Oddie

Structure of the episode
 Skit: Medley of Songs in Music Hall style
 Skit: Radio Prune goes International
 Song: "Wonderful Noises"
 Play: "Jorrocks: The Memoirs of a Fox Hunting Man"

Julius Caesar

Cast

Structure of the episode
 Skit: Mrs. Glasshouse (knitting solidly for four years)
 Skit: Parking Warden
 Madrigal: "The Ship Put to Sea in the Month of May"
 Skit: Dr. Cleese and patient (Bill Oddie) in 'Check-up'
 Song: "Police Constable Herbert Platt, Somerset Constabulary - Greatest Lawman of Them All"
 Skit: Harmony Hearts Marriage Guidance Bureau
 Play: "Julius Caesar"

L plays

Lady Godiva

Cast

Structure of the episode

Laurence of Antarctica - On Ice
Written by Graeme Garden and Bill Oddie

Cast
The characters are listed in bold letters

 Announcer and Narrator — David Hatch
 Captain Oates — Tim Brooke-Taylor
 Captain Scott — Graeme Garden
 Captain Cleese— John Cleese
 Captain Oddie — Bill Oddie
 Lady Constance — Tim Brooke-Taylor
 Controller of the BBC — John Cleese
 Salami — Jo Kendall
 Snips — John Cleese
 Nanook — Bill Oddie

Structure of the episode

Liverpool

Cast

Structure of the episode
Beatles songs: "Martha, My Dear", "Don't Pass Me By" and "Eleanor Rigby" (instrumental)
 Skit: Interview with the oldest man in Liverpool
(opening music)
 Skit: More on Liverpool
 Song: "Ferry Across the Mersey" (Liverpudlian Love Song)
 Skit: More on Liverpool
 Song: "Liverpool Girl"

The Lone Stranger

Cast

The characters are listed in bold letters

 The Lone Stranger — Tim Brooke-Taylor
 Sidekick to the Lone Stranger — Bill Oddie
 Gunfighter — John Cleese
 Saloon Owner — Jean Hart

Structure of the episode
 Skit: Court Case
 Skit: Tour of Britain (4 minute tour)
 Skit: John and Mary sketch (John Cleese and Jean Hart)
 Skit: Three babies sketch
 Song: "Cricket tranquiliser"
 Play: "The Lone Stranger"

Long Range Weather Forecast

Cast

Structure of the episode

M plays

Macbeth
(Favourite Stories of Shakespeare)

Written by Bill Oddie

Cast
 Macbeth – John Cleese
 Lady Macbeth – Jo Kendall
 Banquo – Graeme Garden
 Hecate (Lady Constance de Coverlet) – Tim Brooke-Taylor
 Sister of Hecate – Bill Oddie
 Duncan – Graeme Garden
 Duncan's Manservant – Bill Oddie
 1st Murderer – Tim Brooke-Taylor 
 2nd Murderer – Bill Oddie
 Macbeth's Manservant – Tim Brooke-Taylor
 Porter – Bill Oddie
 Messenger – Bill Oddie
 Hairy Liquid Announcer – Graeme Garden
 Hairy Liquid Jingle Singers – Bill Oddie and Graeme Garden

Structure of the episode
 Cold Open: Two-Tier MaiI Service – The Cast
 Skit: The Kevin Mousetrap Show – The Cast
 Song: What A Wonderful World – Bill Oddie, Tim Brooke-Taylor, Graeme Garden, John Cleese, and Jo Kendall
 Skit: Take Your Clothes Off – Graeme Garden and Jo Kendall
 Song: Down On Melody Farm – Bill Oddie and the Cast
 Skit: Traffic Warning – David Hatch
 Song: Macbeth – The Cast

Marriage Bureau

Cast

Structure of the episode

Moll Flounders

Cast

Structure of the episode

Murder On The 3:17 To Cleethorpes

Cast
 Cliff Hanger-Ending ― David Hatch
 Ms. Measles ― Jo Kendall
 Lady Constance de Coverlet ― Tim Brooke-Taylor
 Australian Spy ― Graeme Garden
 PA Announcer ― Jo Kendall
 Twiggy ― Graeme Garden
 Ticket Office Clerk ― Bill Oddie
 Porter ― Tim Brooke-Taylor
 Ticket Collector ― Bill Oddie
 Men Whispering "Danger and Excitement" ― Tim Brooke-Taylor, Graeme Garden, and Bill Oddie
 Introduction by Jo Kendall, with Tim Brooke-Taylor
 Complaints by Bill Oddie

Structure of the episode
 Cold Open: People We Shall Be Offending This Week ― Graeme Garden, Jo Kendall, David Hatch, Bill Oddie, and Tim Brooke-Taylor
 Announcement: Warning to Motorists ― David Hatch
 Vox Pop: Complaint Letter ― Graeme Garden, with David Hatch
 Skit: The Rolf Harris Dirty Songbook ― Jo Kendall
 Vox Pop: Letter to the Queen ― Graeme Garden
 Announcement: A Choice in Viewing ― David Hatch and Bill Oddie
 Skit: Three Babies: NSPCC Inspector ― Tim Brooke-Taylor, David Hatch, and Bill Oddie, with Jo Kendall and Graeme Garden
 Skit: Is This Your Life: Arnold Gibbon ― Graeme Garden and Bill Oddie, with David Hatch
 Announcement: If You Have Seen This Man ― David Hatch
 Announcement: Police Warning ― David Hatch and Bill Oddie
 Song: "Stuffing the Gibbon" ― Bill Oddie and the Cast (as the Tillingbourne Folk and Madrigal Society)
 Prune Play: Murder on the 3:17 to Cleethorpes ― The Cast

My Man, Grimbling

Cast

Structure of the episode

N plays

Nelson

Cast

Structure of the Episode
 Cold Open: The Archers – John Cleese, Graeme Garden, and Bill Oddie
 Sketch: I’m Worried, Doctor – Tim Brooke-Taylor and Jo Kendall
 Sketch: Radio Strip Club – John Cleese and Graeme Garden
 Song: "Travel Song" – Bill Oddie and the Cast
 Sketch: The Actual Fairy – Tim Brooke-Taylor, David Hatch, and Jo Kendall
 Song: "I'm in Love with a Lion" – Jo Kendall
 Play: Nelson – The Cast

Nibble on the Bone

Cast

Structure of the episode

O plays

Operation Chocolate

Cast

Structure of the episode
 Cold Open: Football Results – Graeme Garden, Bill Oddie, and John Cleese
 Skit: Squealbase – The Cast
 Skit: Continental Coach Trip – John Cleese 
 Song: "Julie Andrews" – Bill Oddie and the Cast
 Play: Operation Chocolate – The Cast

Othello
(The Moor the Merrier)

Written by Bill Oddie

Cast
(cast in order of appearance)

Main characters are listed in bold letters

 Othello — Bill Oddie
 Desdemona — Jo Kendall
 Desdemona's Father — John Cleese
 Amelia — Tim Brooke-Taylor
 Iago — Tim Brooke-Taylor
 Doge — David Hatch
 Cassio (the Pansy) — John Cleese
 Messenger — Bill Oddie

Structure of the episode

P plays

People Are Out

Cast

Structure of the episode

Q plays

External links

ISIRTA plays